The Flower Girl is a North Korean revolutionary genre theatrical performance.

The Flower Girl may also refer to:
 The Flower Girl (Ingham), 19th-century painting
 The Flower Girl (Murillo), 17th-century painting
 "(I Love) The Flower Girl", another name for "The Rain, the Park & Other Things", a 1967 song by The Cowsills

See also
 The Flower Girl of Potsdam Square, a 1925 German silent comedy film